Eettappuli is a 1983 Indian Malayalam film, directed by Crossbelt Mani. The film stars Shankar, Ambika, Balan K. Nair and Silk Smitha in the lead roles. The film has musical score by G. Devarajan.

Cast

Shankar as Khabeer
Ambika as Padmavathi
K. P. Ummer as Pareed
Balan K. Nair as Sekharan
Silk Smitha 
Vijayalalitha  as Jayanthi
Raveendran as Inspector Jayan
Kuthiravattom Pappu as Pappu
Poojappura Ravi as Peter
Ranipadmini as Hema
Renuchandra as Renu
Suchithra as Parukutty

Soundtrack
The music was composed by G. Devarajan and the lyrics were written by Poovachal Khader.

References

External links
 

1983 films
1980s Malayalam-language films
Films directed by Crossbelt Mani